Flaga: Book of Angels Volume 27 is an album by pianist Craig Taborn, bassist Christian McBride and drummer Tyshawn Sorey which was released in 2016 on John Zorn's Tzadik Records as part of the Zorn's Book of Angels Series.

Recording and reception

The album was recorded at Second Story Sound, New York City, on November 25, 2015. All About Jazz stated, "Taborn and his band-mates have—in their immersion on John Zorn's music—crafted a singular trio sound—ruggedly iconoclastic, fresh, fervid, relentlessly off-kilter yet still compellingly melodic, and beautiful, on this splendid recording."

Track listing 
All compositions by John Zorn.

 "Machnia" - 7:59	
 "Peliel" - 4:34	
 "Katzfiel" - 4:18	
 "Talmai" [Take 1] - 4:43	
 "Shoftiel" - 10:41	
 "Agbas" - 4:08	
 "Rogziel" - 2:38	
 "Harbonah" - 4:09	
 "Talmai" [Take 2] - 5:42

Personnel 
Craig Taborn - piano
Christian McBride - bass
Tyshawn Sorey - drums

References

External links 
 Flaga page on Masada World

2016 albums
Tzadik Records albums
Craig Taborn albums
Christian McBride albums
Albums produced by John Zorn
Book of Angels albums